Blossom Lady was a leading New Zealand Standardbred racehorse. Affectionately known as "The Bloss" she is most noted for winning the 1992 New Zealand Trotting Cup and New Zealand Free-For-All double. She also won the 1994 and 1995 A G Hunter Cup in Melbourne, Victoria and in total she won eight Group 1 races. 

She was crowned New Zealand Horse of the Year in 1993. 

Her owners were the Polly Syndicate comprising Ralph & Judy, Bill & Robyn Kermode, Pat & Mary Foley, Bob & Barbara Williams, Ian & Jenny Smith and Ross & Adrienne Kennedy.  The majority of her owners were based in Palmerston North and she was initially trained there by Stephen Doody but after 6 wins (at Manawatu and Cheviot), she was moved to Derek Jones at Templeton near Christchurch. She was driven in the majority of her victories by Anthony Butt, grandson of trainer Derek Jones.  Derek himself drove her in one win and his son Peter Jones drove her to two wins. Stephen Doody drove her to five of her six wins when he trained her at Palmerston North.   

She was known and admired for her stamina and her long career, she raced in six New Zealand Cups and won races at five separate Inter Dominion carnivals. She also won the New Zealand Standardbred Breeders Stakes three times.

When she was retired she was the leading stake-winning mare in Australasia.

Her son, Mister D G, foaled 7 December 1997 (Camtastic, USA) was also a top class race-horse who won 20 races including six in Australia. He won the 2004 A G Hunter Cup that his mother had won twice.

Blossom Lady died on 18 May 2004.

She was inducted into the New Zealand Trotting Hall of Fame and the Addington Harness Hall of Fame.  She also had a Lounge named after her at Addington Raceway.

Major race wins
Blossom Lady's winning performances included:

 1990 Hannon Memorial, beating Bold Sharvid and Balonne.
 1991 New Zealand Standardbred Breeders Stakes beating Wreleys and Lady Bonnie
 1991 Inter Dominion Consolation (Auckland), beating Tight Connection and Thorate
 1991 Invercargill Cup, beating Tartan Clansman and Strietross
 1991 Easter Cup, over 3200m, beating Inky Lord and Popsicle
 1991 Ashburton Flying Stakes, beating Inky Lord and Clancy
 1991 New World Cup (Forbury), beating Popsicle and Lord Magic
 1992 New Zealand Standardbred Breeders Stakes beating Lady Bonnie and Seaswift Franco
 1992 Invercargill Cup, beating Giovanetto and Air Supply
 1992 New Zealand Trotting Cup, beating Giovanetto and Christopher Vance
 1992 New Zealand Free For All, beating Sogo and Christopher Vance
 1993 New Zealand Standardbred Breeders Stakes beating Lady's Day and Smooth Gretna
 1993 Palmerstonian Classic (Manawatu), beating Pacing Machine and Doctor Vic
 1993 New Zealand Mares Championship, beating Lady's Day and Smooth Gretna
 1993 Hannon Memorial, beating Master Musician and Tigerish
 1994 A G Hunter Cup, beating Christopher Vance and The Unicorn
 1994 Speights Cup (Forbury), beating Pay Me Back and Light Year
 1995 A G Hunter Cup, beating Master Musician and Golden Reign

See also
 Harness racing in New Zealand

References

New Zealand standardbred racehorses
New Zealand Trotting Cup winners
1984 racehorse births
2004 racehorse deaths